Where We Belong is a 2012 New York Times bestselling chick-lit novel by Emily Giffin. The novel was released by St. Martin's Press on July 24, 2012. Where We Belong has been optioned to become a film, with Giffin serving as producer. The book is narrated partly through the perspective of Kirby Rose, and is Giffin's first novel with a teenager as a main character.

Synopsis
Marian always thought that she was living the life she wanted, with no true regrets. When Kirby Rose, the child she gave up eighteen years ago, appears on her doorstep Marian is forced to re-examine her life, her family, and a past romance that threatens to overwhelm her.

Reception
Reception for Where We Belong has been mixed to positive, with the Chicago Sun-Times calling it an easy read while criticizing the book's predictability. The Seattle Times and Vancouver Sun both overall praised the novel, with the Vancouver Sun calling Giffin a "gifted storyteller".

References

External links
Official author page
Official publisher page
Goodreads interview with Giffin

Chick lit novels
Novels set in New York (state)
2012 American novels
St. Martin's Press books